Amarodytes is a genus of beetles in the family Dytiscidae, containing the following species:

 Amarodytes boggianii Régimbart, 1900
 Amarodytes duponti (Aubé, 1838)
 Amarodytes guidi Guignot, 1957
 Amarodytes oberthueri Régimbart, 1900
 Amarodytes percosioides Régimbart, 1900
 Amarodytes plaumanni Gschwendtner, 1935
 Amarodytes pulchellus Guignot, 1955
 Amarodytes segrix Guignot, 1950
 Amarodytes testaceopictus Régimbart, 1900
 Amarodytes undulatus Gschwendtner, 1954

References

Dytiscidae